Ruan Chongwu (born May 1933 in Huai'an County, Hebei) is a politician of the People's Republic of China.

Biography
He graduated from the Mechanical Engineering Department of Moscow Automotive College in 1957. 

He was the Minister of Public Security of the People's Republic of China from September 1985 to March 1987, the Minister of Labor from 1989 to 1993, and the Governor of Hainan Province from 1993 to 1998.

Ruan was the member of the 13th and 14th CPC Central Committee from 1987 to 1997.

External links
 Ruan Chongwu's Profile

1933 births
Living people
Governors of Hainan
Politicians from Zhangjiakou
People's Republic of China politicians from Hebei
Chinese Communist Party politicians from Hebei
Ministers of Public Security of the People's Republic of China